Dickstein is a surname. Notable people with the surname include:

Mindi Dickstein, American lyricist and librettist
Morris Dickstein (1940–2021), American literary scholar, cultural historian, professor, essayist, book critic, and public intellectual
Samuel Dickstein (congressman) (1885–1954), American politician
Samuel Dickstein (mathematician) (1851–1939), Polish mathematician

German-language surnames
Jewish surnames